Sri Venkatesa Perumal Temple (Melathiruppathi) – Mondipalayam is counted among the noted Vishnu temples of Kongunadu. The image of the lord is flat on the four sides and conical in the center. The form was first discovered by one Kondamanaicker around 300 years ago. The devotee once sighted his cow shedding her milk on a sandhill. Induced by curiosity, he dug it, when manifested the image with Conch (Sanguchakkram) and Disc (Chakkram) as well as Saligram and Chikandi (weapon). Inspired by the divine revolution, he ordered a temple to be built up for Sri Venketachalapathi enshrining the form. Devotees who have taken vows to make offering to the lord of the seven hills can fulfill them in Mondipalayam, in the event of their inability to go to Tirupati.

Location

This temple is in Tirupur District.

It is on the Coimbatore – Sathyamangalam highway, 5 km east of Pasur village on the Annur-        Sathy road. It can be reached from Tirupur (30 km away) through Avinashi. The temple is 27 km from Sathyamangalam through Punjai Puliampatti.

Devotion

This temple called Melai Tirupathi, an abode of Sri Venkatesa Perumal (Lord Balaji), sits majestically in the middle of four streets. The "Dwajasthambam" is seen at the entrance. The Bali Peetam and the Kodi Maram (flag post) are seen at the entrance. Further ahead is "Garuda Azhwar" praying to the Lord with folded hands facing the main deity. Ahead is the Maha Mandapam and the Ardah Mandapam. On entering, devotees have a spiritual experience hearing the divine words "Om Namo Narayana" in their hearts.

The main deity is in the form of a Swayambu in the sanctum sanctorum. The Lord "Sri Venkatesa Perumal" facing eastward gives his divine darshan to his devotees. As one continues to pray here, devotees receive the darshan with the blessings of the Lord and experience an inner calm and a flow of divine energy within.

Devotees then come out to the inner "Prakaram" (corridor) of the temple. Moving clockwise, there is the sannidhi of "Venugopalaswamy" and then a passage having the sannidhi of "Chakrathazhwar" facing east. Coming back to the inner prakaram(outer courtyard) is the sannidhi of "Anjanaiyar" (Sri Hanuman). After the darshan of the Azhwars (the twelve mystic saints), one gets the grace of "Thumbikai Azhwar" (Lord Ganesa). The sannidhi of  "Alamelumangai Thayar" (Goddess Mahalakshmi) with the having a graceful smile and bestow blessings with her four hands. The next sannidhi has "Andal" in a standing posture facing east showering devotees with her blessings. Moving forward we find the idols of Sri Tirupati Venkatachalapathy followed by the ten incarnations (Dashavatara) of Lord Vishnu and Sri Srirangam Ranganathar. Across the idols one finds the "Lord’s Lotus feet" (Thiruvadi). The traditional "Swarga Vaasal" which is opened every year on Vaikunta Ekadashi which is blessed by the  sannidhi of "Vaikunta Narayanamurthi" along with his consort "Lakshmi Devi". Finally after the darshan of "Sanishwarar" one can reach the "Kodimaram".

Moolasthanam
The main deity Venkatesa Perumal is in the form of Swayambu. The vision of the Lord and his benign presence fill the devotees’ heart with peace and calm. The presiding deity, (Utsava Moorthy) Sri Venkatesa Perumal gives us his darshan along with his consorts, Sri Devi and Bhudevi.

Poojas
Darshan (open to the public) hours are from 6.00 a.m. to 8.00 p.m. On festival days the temple opens at 4.30 a.m.

 Adhikalai Poojai: 6:00 AM
 Ucchikaala Poojai: 12:00
 Saingalam: 6:00 PM

Thirukalyana Utsavam
Performing Thirukalyana Utsavam to the Lord in this temple is considered very special. It is held at the same time (10.30 to 12.00 AM) as the Tirumala Tirupathi temple. The uniqueness is that it is performed as a prayer (Venduthal) by the devotees throughout the year. The wedding ceremony is held amidst recitation of Vedic mantras. It is believed that performing Kalyana Utsavam to the Lord here will bring immense peace and prosperity to the family of the devotees.

Satyanarayana Puja
The special pooja is performed every month on full moon day at around 5 PM . The main homam performed for this is the Sudarshana homam which brings immense gratification to the devotees performing it. The Sudarshana Chakra (the discus of the lord) is the one that always protects his devotees. It is the main weapon (astram) adorning Lord Vishnu in all his 10 incarnations. The Sudarshana Chakra is the one which is known as the "Chakrathazhwar". Devotees performing this pooja will overcome their difficulties and will be blessed with wealth, prosperity, progeny and happiness in their family.

Homams

From time immemorial yagnas or homams are performed by devotees to seek the grace of the Lord and to grant happiness and prosperity to his bhaktas. A separate enclosure has been constructed at the temple for performing homams. These include

 Sudarshana Homam
 Lakshmi Narasimha Homam
 Lakshmi Hayagrivar Homam

These homams are performed every month (except in the Tamil month of Purattasi). Further details may be obtained by contacting the temple office.

Bhajans

Every month on the 2nd and 4th Saturday (except in the Tamil month of Purattasi), bhajans are performed at the temple. They sing devoutly in praise of Sriman Narayana and devotees join in the religious fervour. This is followed by annadanam.

Thirumanjanam (Abhishekam)

Thirumanjanam is performed for the mail deity (moolavar) on all Saturdays at 7.00 AM and on special days/festivals at the time fixed for the same. Thirumanjanam is performed for all the other deities/Azhwars on the 1st Friday of every Tamil month at about 9.00 AM. Devotees wishing to participate/contribute/donate for the same may contact the temple office.

Festivals

Purattasi festival

This festival is celebrated with grandeur in the Tamil month of Purattasi (during September/October months) for six consecutive Saturdays. People converge at the temple from across India and overseas. During these days the temple presents a sea of humanity immersed in bhakthi for the Lord. These Saturdays at the temple begin as early as 4.00 AM with an "Abhishekam" or "Thiumanjanam" aradhanai for the Lord. The Maha Deeparadhanai is performed at noon. In the evening the Lord is taken along with his consorts Sridevi and Bhudevi on a majestic Garuda vahanam around the four streets of the temple in a tastefully decorated floral palanquin (Pushpaka Pallaki). The unique feature of this is the bhaktas fulfilling their vows by carrying an arrow shaped "Meravanai". For generations people have been following this custom where they remit money in the name of their family members and receive this "Meravanai". They accompany the palanquin carrying it.

On these days a special hundi is placed here. It is believed that devotees who wish to make their offerings to Tirupathi Balaji but who are unable visit Tirupathi Tirumala may place their offerings in this hundial to receive His blessings. The entire day is very busy with special programs, bhajans, etc. Annadanam (free feeding), is carried out throughout the day. To facilitate the transportation for pilgrims, several special buses ply from points in and around Coimbatore and nearby places on these days.

Temple Chariot festival

This festival commences in the Tamil month of Thai with the Dwajarohana the hoisting of the Garudadwaja (flag with the emblem of black Garuda). Following this, the festival is held for 11 days. The temple chariot is taken around the four streets of the temple on the day of the "punarpoosam" (punarvasa) star. On the evenings of the festival, the Lord and the consorts are taken around the streets of the temple on vahanams (vehicles) such as " Anna Vahanam" (peacock), "Simha Vahanam" (Narasimha), "Hanumantha Vahanam" (Hanuman), "Garuda  Vahanam" (king of birds), "Pushpaka vimanam", "Yanai Vahanam" ( elephant), "Kudirai Vahanam" (horse), "Sesha Vahanam" (Adishesha – Lord's serpent).  Thirukalyana  Uthsavam is performed the day before the car festival and  "Theppothsavam" (Pushkarni or temple tank float) is performed on the day after the car festival. The Garudadwaja is then lowered. The temple wears a very festive look and thousands of devotees shouting  "Govinda" throng the temple to participate in this unique festival.

Other Sannathi in Temple

Excluding Moolavar and Urchavar, there are Sri Venugopalan Sannathi, Sri Chakrathalwar Sannathi, Sri Anjaneyar Sannathi, Alwargal Sannathi, Sri Thumbikaialwar Sannathi, Sri Mahalakshmi Thayar Sannathi, Sri Andal Sannathi, Dasavatharam Idols, Sri Vaikunta Nathar Sannathi, Sri Saneeswaran Sannathi.

Management

Hereditary trustees and officials of the HR and CE department of the government of Tamil Nadu with active support from the devotees manage the activities of the temple.

References

External links
 : Official Website of Sri Venkatesa Perumal Temple, Mondipalayam
 : Coimbatore Website
 :Blog
 :Wikimap

Hindu temples in Tiruppur district